Wairarapa (often expressed as The Wairarapa) is a region in New Zealand.

Wairarapa may also refer to:

Geography
 Lake Wairarapa, a lake from which the region gets its name

Political and regional administration
 Wairarapa (New Zealand electorate), a parliamentary electorate
 Wairarapa North, a former parliamentary electorate
 Wairarapa South, a former parliamentary electorate
 Wairarapa and Hawke's Bay (New Zealand electorate), a former parliamentary electorate
 South Wairarapa District, an administrative area

Sport
 Wairarapa Bush Rugby Football Union, a rugby union club
 Wairarapa Rugby Football Union, a rugby union club merged into the Wairarapa Bush Rugby Football Union
 Wairarapa United, a football club

Transport
 Wairarapa Line, a railway line in the Wairarapa region
 NZR RM class (Wairarapa), a railcar
 Wairarapa Mail, a former train service
 Wairarapa Connection, an interurban commuter rail service
 SS Wairarapa, a ship that sank in 1894

Other uses
 Wairarapa (gastropod), a genus of sea snails
 Radio Wairarapa, a radio station